A Day with Wilbur Robinson is a 1990 American children's picture book (slightly expanded for a 2006 reissue) written and illustrated by William Joyce. A loose film adaptation called Meet the Robinsons was released by Walt Disney Pictures in 2007 in the United States.

Plot summary
A Day with Wilbur Robinson follows the story of a boy who visits an unusual family and their home. While spending the day in the Robinson household, Wilbur's best friend joins in the search for Grandfather Robinson's missing false teeth and meets one wacky relative after another.

Characters
 Lewis is Wilbur Robinson's best friend. He visits the home of his best friend and spends all day there. He joins in the search for Grandfather Robinson and his missing false teeth and meets all the Robinson relatives.
 Wilbur Robinson is a boy who, with his friend, searches his home for Grandfather Robinson's teeth. In the process Wilbur lets Lewis meet his family.
 Mr. Robinson is Wilbur's father.
 Mrs. Robinson is Wilbur's mother.
 Uncles Dmitri & Spike are Wilbur's uncles who live outside.
 Lefty is the Robinsons' octopus butler.
 Aunt Billie is Wilbur's aunt with a life size train set.
 Cousin Pete is Wilbur's cousin with tigers as pets.
 Uncle Gaston is Wilbur's uncle with a cannon.
 Uncle Wormly is Wilbur's uncle with a collection of bugs that act like humans.
 Uncle Nimbus is Wilbur's uncle who is obsessed with weather.
 Uncle Orbley is Wilbur's uncle who is obsessed with bubbles.
 Uncle Judlow is Wilbur's uncle who uses a device to think deep thoughts.
 Uncle Art is Wilbur's uncle who travels through space.
 Cousin Lazlo is Wilbur's cousin with an anti-gravity machine.
 Tallulah Robinson is Wilbur's sister who likes to talk on the phone.
 Blanche Robinson is Wilbur's sister who wears odd dresses.
 Grandfather Robinson is Wilbur's grandfather who owns a band of singing frogs and is always missing parts like false teeth and a glass eye. He himself occasionally goes missing as well.
 Grandmother Robinson is Wilbur's grandmother who occasionally helps out her husband.
 Mr. Ellington is a friend of Grandfather Robinson based on Duke Ellington.
 Mr. Armstrong is a friend of Grandfather Robinson based on Louis Armstrong.

Film adaptation

Walt Disney Animation Studios released on March 30, 2007 a 3-D computer-animated film adaptation Meet the Robinsons, directed by Stephen J. Anderson.

Publication data

A Day with Wilbur Robinson (HarperTrophy reprint edition, September 30, 1993) ; 
A Day with Wilbur Robinson (Laura Geringer, August 22, 2006) ; 

1990 children's books
American picture books
Children's fiction books
HarperCollins books
Meet the Robinsons